Irina Leonova (born 3 February 1961) is a Kazakhstani archer. She competed in the women's individual and team events at the 1996 Summer Olympics.

References

External links
 

1961 births
Living people
Kazakhstani female archers
Olympic archers of Kazakhstan
Archers at the 1996 Summer Olympics
Place of birth missing (living people)
Archers at the 1994 Asian Games
Archers at the 1998 Asian Games
Medalists at the 1998 Asian Games
Asian Games medalists in archery
Asian Games bronze medalists for Kazakhstan
20th-century Kazakhstani women